Chris Achuff (born September 18, 1975) is an American football coach who is currently the defensive line coach for the Syracuse Orange. He previously served as an defensive line coach for the Arizona Cardinals of the National Football League (NFL).

Coaching career

College
From 2008 to 2016, Achuff served as the defensive line coach at Baylor University.

On March 11, 2020, Achuff was named linebackers coach at Syracuse in a return to college football.

National Football League

Arizona Cardinals
In 2018, Achuff was hired by the Arizona Cardinals to be their assistant defensive line coach. On January 31, 2019, Achuff was promoted to defensive line coach.

On December 30, 2019, it was announced that Achuff  was being let go by the Cardinals after spending two seasons there.

References

1975 births
Living people
Players of American football from Philadelphia
American football linebackers
Bloomsburg Huskies football players
Coaches of American football from Pennsylvania
Kutztown Golden Bears football coaches
Chattanooga Mocs football coaches
Charleston Southern Buccaneers football coaches
UT Martin Skyhawks football coaches
Baylor Bears football coaches
Navarro Bulldogs football coaches
Arizona Cardinals coaches
Syracuse Orange football coaches